Indian Creek originally known as Sage Creek, is a tributary stream of the Beaver River in Beaver County, Utah.

History
Indian Creek was originally named Sage Creek by the Jefferson Hunt Wagon Train in 1849, that camped at a crossing point on its banks and measured its distance from there to Cove Fort.

See also
List of rivers of Utah

References

Rivers of Utah
Rivers of the Great Basin
Mormon Road